Al-Bu Duraj or Al-Duraji; Arabic: ٱلْدَرّاجٚي ,ٱلْبو دَرّاجٚ; is a part of the Tribes of Arabia, mainly located in Iraq but also has small groups situated in Saudi Arabia, Oman and some parts of Northern Africa. The Al-Duraji tribe is prominently mentioned in the book "Marsh Arabs", by Sir Wilfred Patrick Thesiger (1964)

The main tribe of Al-Bu Daraj is based in Baghdad, but also has large groups based in Basra. Al-Bu Daraj's grand sheikh and overall leader is Sheikh Ali Alsha'lan; Arabic: (الشيخ علي الشعلان). The tribe of Al-Bu Daraj remains both Shia and Sunni and recent turmoil between both sects has not affected the civil relationship within the Tribe, some even speculating the double crescent in the Bani Duraj banner/flag signifies the unification of both sects.

Al-Bu Duraj's reputation
Al-Bu Duraj are known locally as the "Lions", Arabic: (الاسود); for there valiant and courageous acts in protecting their land, Iraq, and their people. Even with the segregation between Islamic Sects; Bani Duraj stood strong; Shia's, Sunni's, Arabs and Afro-Arabs all fought together under the Al-Duraji tribe – aiding the Iraqi Armed Forces in the victory and liberation of Iraq.

Land disputes with the State of Kuwait 
During the epoch of the Iraqi Insurgency and the Iraqi Civil War, the State of Kuwait attempted to alter the Iraq–Kuwait barrier in the Basra Governorate and usurp Iraqi land. Due to Bani Duraj having a fair amount of tribesmen situated in the Basra Governorate, they decided to collectively warn the country of Kuwait. However, Kuwait decided to respond by taunting and mildly disrespecting the Duraji Tribe and their tribesmen, which proved to be a fatal mistake by the Kuwaitis, enraging the tribesmen and causing a localised war between Al-Bu Duraj and Kuwait and concluding to a swift and humiliating loss for the Kuwaitis, causing them to retreat against the tribesmen forces due to the tribesmen courageous and fearless armed front, resulting in a forceful halt of Kuwait's alterations and a return to the original Iraq–Kuwait barrier.

Notable tribe members
 Oussama Darragi – (born 3 April 1987) is a Tunisian professional footballer who plays as an attacking midfielder. He plays for Club Africain and the Tunisian national football team. He has won the noble award of African-based Player of the Year: 2011
 Abdul-Jabbar Al-Duraji, Arabic: (عبدالجبار الدراجي) – an Iraqi musical artist who is nicknamed the creator of modern Iraqi music
 Hafid Derradji – (born 10 October 1964) in El Harrach, is a sports commentator of the Qatar channel beIN SPORTS in Arabic formerly on Télévision Algérienne, and former Algerian footballer.
 Abu Bakr Al-Duraji – full name: Abu Bakr Abbas Yasiin Al-Duraji – Arabic: (ابو بكر عباس ياسين الدراجي) was a prized Iraqi war general who was martyred protecting Iraqi borders against ISIS. His two memorial videos on YouTube garnered approximately 5 million views
 Mohamed Al-Daradji – (born 6 August 1978 in Baghdad, Iraq) is an Iraqi-Dutch film director. He studied theatre in Iraq, and cinematography – gaining and Master's Degree and directing in England. He is known for his drama films, which focus on political affairs in the Middle East and their effects on interpersonal relationships. He has won awards such as the Variety's Middle Eastern Filmmaker of the Year 2010 and the 2006 Brooklyn International Film Festival Spirit Award for the film "Ahlaam"
Abder-Rahmane Derradji (born 17 May 1959) is an Algerian-born British Associate Professor. He studied Political science & International relations at the University of Reading, England, and is an active scholar, political analyst, poet, and writer. Derradji has lectured in a number of universities in both Eastern and Western Europe, Indonesia, Poland, Oman, UAE and others, and has published a number of articles, books and reports on current affairs. His expertise is in political violence in international relations.

See also
Tribes of Arabia
Arab tribes in Iraq

References

Tribes of Arabia
Tribes of Iraq
Arab groups
History of the Arabian Peninsula